Harold "Tank" Stotsbery (May 11, 1907 – November 13, 1939) was an American football player. 

A native of Ohio, he attended Aquinas High School in Columbus, Ohio. He then attended Xavier University in Cincinnati. He played college football as a tackle for the Xavier football team from 1927 to 1929 and was selected as co-captain of the 1929 Xavier football team. 

He also played professional football in the National Football League (NFL) for the Brooklyn Dodgers during the 1930 season. He appeared in two NFL games.

References

1907 births
1939 deaths
Xavier Musketeers football players
Brooklyn Dodgers (NFL) players
Players of American football from Ohio